Bir Muktijoddha Asaduzzaman Stadium is located in Magura, Bangladesh. It is the home ground of Magura District Cricket Team & Magura District Football Team.

See also
Stadiums in Bangladesh
List of cricket grounds in Bangladesh

References

Cricket grounds in Bangladesh
Football venues in Bangladesh